During the 1984–85 season, the Scottish football club :Hibernian F.C. was placed 8th in the :Scottish Premier Division. The team reached the third round of both the :Scottish Cup and the :Scottish League Cup.

Scottish Premier Division

Final League table

Scottish League Cup

Scottish Cup

See also
List of Hibernian F.C. seasons

References

External links
Hibernian 1984/1985 results and fixtures, Soccerbase

Hibernian F.C. seasons
Hibernian